The Belmont Sprint is a Perth Racing Group 3 Thoroughbred open Weight for Age race over a distance of 1400 metres at Belmont Park Racecourse, Perth, Western Australia in late May or early June. Total prizemoney for the race is A$200,000.

History

Grade

1963–1979 -  Principal Race
1980 onwards -  Group 3

Distance
1963–1972 - 6 furlongs
1973 - 1300 metres
1974–1977 - 1200 metres
1978–1981 - 1300 metres
1982 onwards - 1400 metres

Conditions
In 2015 the race conditions were changed from a Quality handicap to Weight for Age.

Winners

 2022 - God Has Chosen
 2021 - The Velvet King
 2020 - Perfect Jewel
 2019 - Galaxy Star
 2018 - Material Man
 2017 - Rock Magic
 2016 - Wink And A Nod
 2015 - Shining Knight
 2014 - Elite Belle
 2013 - Kerrific
 2012 - Luckygray
 2011 - Grand Nirvana
 2010 - Grand Nirvana
 2009 - Universal Ruler
 2008 - Marasco
 2007 - Beat The Storm
 2006 - Let Go Thommo
 2005 - Who Did It
 2004 - Modem
 2003 - Tribula
 2002 - Dark 'N' Dangerous
 2001 - Corporate Bruce
 2000 - News Review
 1999 - True Lover
 1998 - San Salvador
 1997 - Cash In The Bank
 1996 - Bar Dreamer
 1995 - Craft Memory
 1994 - Bold Extreme
 1993 - Dynamor
 1992 - Blonde Jev
 1991 - Global Impact
 1990 - Tsaritsyn
 1989 - Il Ferrari
 1988 - Snowy Kitty
 1987 - Another Omen
 1986 - Soft As Snow
 1985 - Casshoney
 1984 - Misty Shell
 1983 - Art Roy
1982 - Kiwi Bride
1981 - Echoes Of Spring
1980 - Tangiers
1979 - National Boy
1978 - National Boy
1977 - Burgess Queen
1976 - Interchange
1975 - Craigie Boy
1974 - Minor Control
1973 - Clear Mak
1972 - All Legal
1971 - Baywana
1970 - Countlike
1969 - Firelight
1968 - Santaland
1967 - Aquitania
1966 - Cosy Comet
1965 - De Gaullio
1964 - Covanus
1963 - Free Style

See also
 List of Australian Group races
 Group races

References

Horse races in Australia
Sport in Perth, Western Australia